Dirt Femme is the fifth studio album by Swedish singer Tove Lo. It was independently released by her label Pretty Swede Records on 14 October 2022.

Background 
Tove Lo released her fourth studio album, Sunshine Kitty, in September 2019. It received positive reviews from contemporary music critics and had a moderate commercial performance. In May of the following year, after touring across Europe and North and South America, the singer reissued the album with the subtitle Paw Prints Edition, including four additional songs and four remixes. Two years after Sunshine Kitty, Lo started teasing via social media the release of a fifth album; by September 2021, the record was "taking shape". Earlier that year, in April, fellow singer Charli XCX revealed she worked with Lo in "making the best music ever" in Palm Springs, California. The two previously collaborated on "Out of My Head", from XCX's 2017 mixtape Pop 2, as well as on the 2018 remix of "Bitches" from Lo's 2017 album Blue Lips.

In May 2022, Lo announced Pretty Swede Records, her own record label under artist development company Mtheory. Being independently released, Dirt Femme marks the first time Lo had complete creative control over an album's development process. Although she recognizes the importance of her former contract with the Universal Music Group, which was "crucial" for her to breakthrough worldwide, Lo "like[s] to make these intricate stories that don't help the algorithm and maybe aren't the most commercial way to do pop releases and how you put out pop music". The album's making was compared by the singer to a "emotional bungee jump" because its development process was the first since her debut, Queen of the Clouds, to not happen in between touring. "This almost felt like I was back to starting completely new again", she accounted.

Promotion 
Lo's first solo effort in almost two years and Dirt Femme lead single, "How Long" was released on 26 January 2022 as part of the soundtrack from American television series Euphoria. The song was also featured on the fourth episode of the series' second season, "You Who Cannot See, Think of Those Who Can". An accompanying music video directed by Seattle filmmaking duo Kenten premiered on 10 February. Alongside the announcement of Pretty Swede Records' founding on 3 May 2022, Lo issued "No One Dies from Love" as the album's following single and the first material released under the newly founded imprint. The song's music video premiered the same day and was directed by Brazilian duo Alaska Filmes, with whom Lo previously worked with on "Are U Gonna Tell Her?". That day, the singer also announced a concert tour, scheduled to start on 29 October and visit Europe and the United Kingdom. On 21 June 2022, Lo officially revealed the album's title to be Dirt Femme, as well as its track listing, artwork and release date of 14 October. The same day, she released the record's third single, "True Romance". The fourth single, "2 Die 4", was released on 27 July.

Artwork 
In the album's artwork, Lo wears a metallic, robotic scorpion stinger—a reference to her astrological sign, Scorpio—attached to her back while her vagina-inspired logo lies on the side of her hip. According to the singer, her use of scorpion-related imagery reflects the album's approach of femininity: "I just love the fact that the female scorpion eats the male scorpion after mating. I’m in a very lovely relationship now where we have a good balance of crazy between us. But I get told that I draw people in and I consume them".

Composition 
In a June 2022 interview with Rolling Stone, Lo stated that her fifth album would "be a very beautiful visual and sonical journey" and that she created a "new world" for it. Describing the record's lyrics as "extremely personal", she highlighted their inquisitive nature: "It's all my feelings, thoughts and questions put together in under 50 minutes with no answers". The result is a body of work encompassed by songs that "will contradict each other, will probably upset some of you, will make you want to dance, cry, fuck, and drive your car really, really, fast". The album's inspiration came from a moment of introspection during the COVID-19 pandemic as she reflected upon her 10-year career, her femininity and her pansexuality in the midst of her marriage to Charlie Twaddle. She stated: "I'm bringing up all these questions and feelings and emotions that don't necessarily have answers to them. It’s just more my current place of wonder". Lo further explained:"When I started out as a writer and an artist, I used to view my feminine traits as weaker and would enhance my masculine traits to get ahead in life. I feel a big energy shift in my environment since then and this album reflects the various ways my feminine side has both helped and hurt me. I’m a pansexual woman married to a straight man. I believe masculine and feminine lives on a spectrum in all humans. There are so many more interesting nuances than most people want to accept."Lyrics of "Suburbia" address "never wanting marriage, not wanting children, and not feeling like that's a life that I want" and were inspired by the fact that some people get offended by Lo's indifference towards having children of her own. "2 Die 4" samples Swedish character Crazy Frog's 2005 cover of Gershon Kingsley's 1969 song "Popcorn"; it was described as a "nostalgic wet dream" by Rolling Stone writer Tomás Mier. Lo stated that "True Romance" was recorded in a single take and was "really fun" to make due to its more "dramatic" and narrative tone in comparison to most of her works. Inspired by Tony Scott's 1993 film of the same name, "True Romance" is a love song that uses the film's plot to introduce a new story, "one of the most destructive, beautiful, overdramatic spins-out-of-control love stories". Since its lyrics are "very dirty" and play "over a really sexy beat", Lo described "Pineapple Slice" as a mix of "Disco Tits" and "Bitches", both included of her 2017 album Blue Lips.

Critical reception 

Dirt Femme received positive reviews from contemporary music critics. At Metacritic, which assigns a normalised rating out of 100 to reviews from mainstream critics, the album has an average score of 77 based on 14 reviews, indicating "generally favorable reviews". Aggregator AnyDecentMusic? gave it 7.4 out of 10, based on their assessment of the critical consensus.

AllMusic's Heather Phares praised the album's musical direction, writing, "Lo is maturing but holding onto the most important parts of herself. Dirt Femme gives the confessional, sexual, and danceable sides of her music equal time and offers a fuller portrait of her music than we've heard before". The Line of Best Fit writer Sam Franzini poined out that "confidence and unadulterated passion for being herself comes together on Dirt Femme, a much darker album than its predecessor Sunshine Kitty, but truer to Nilsson with its pulsating beats and slinky jams" and also described the album as "sexy, smart, and most importantly; fun" Emma Swann of DIY writes that Dirt Femme sees Lo juxtapose elements ingeniously. Gigwise writer Jordan White described the album as "hot-bodied" additionally stating that is "overtly camp and doesn't shy from its playful side". NME Nick Levine giving it four out of five stars, named the album as "spiky, surprising and not quite cohesive, but never ever boring."

In a mixed review writing for The Skinny, Tara Hepburn identified this album as "pandemic baby" lamented that this project "is a mixed bag as the singer explores new paths for herself". Thomas Bedenbaugh from Slant Magazine criticised the album because of its lack of the sing-along hooks that have made Lo's past efforts, especially 2016's Lady Wood, so memorable, while describing the album as "a collection of slightly melancholic, occasionally catchy dance-floor filler". Pitchforks Peyton Thomas dubbed the album "the first Tove Lo album you can play for your grandparents", claiming that she lost "a lot of her spark in the process" of pivoting to tamer themes and giving more lethargic performances.

Track listing

Notes
 "2 Die 4" samples "Popcorn", composed by Gershon Kingsley.
 "Call on Me" contains elements of "You Spin Me Round (Like a Record)" by English band Dead or Alive from their second album Youthquake (1985).

Personnel
Tove Lo – vocals
Reuben Cohen – mastering engineer
Chris Gehringer – mastering engineer
Şerban Ghenea – mixing engineer
John Hanes – mixing engineer

Charts

Release history

References

2022 albums
Tove Lo albums
Albums produced by SG Lewis